Urikohime, Uriko-hime or Uriko Hime (うりこひめ; English: Princess Melon, Melon Maid or Melon Princess) is a Japanese folktale about a girl that is born out of a melon, adopted by a family and replaced by a creature named Amanojaku.

Summary
A melon comes washing down the stream until it is found by a human couple. They cut open the fruit and a girl appears out of it. They name her Urikohime (uri means "melon" in Japanese). They raise her and she becomes a beautiful young lady. One day, she is left alone at home and told to be careful of any stranger who comes knocking. Unfortunately, a youkai named Amanojaku sets its sights on the girl. The creature appears at her house and asks the girl to open. She opens the door just a bit and the creature forces its entry in her house.

In one version of the story, Amanojaku kills Urikohime and wears her skin. The creature replaces Urikohime as the couple's daughter, but its disguise is ruined when the girl, reincarnated as a little bird, reveals the deception and eventually regains her human form.

In another account, Urikohime becomes known for her great weaving abilities. Due to this, she is betrothed to a lord or prince. Before she marries, Amanojaku kills her and wears her dress, or ties her to a persimmon tree. The false bride is taken to the wedding on a palanquin, but the ruse is discovered. In the version where she is tied up, Urikohime cries out to anyone to hear and is rescued. The creature is chased away.

Alternate names
Scholar Kunio Yanagita indicated alternate names to the tale: Urikohimeko, Urihime, Urihimeko.

Distribution
According to Japanese folklorist Keigo Seki's notations, several variations are recorded in Japanese compilations. Further studies show that the tale can be found all over the Japanese archipelago. Hiroko Ikeda's index of Japanese tales lists 102 versions of the story.

According to Fanny Hagin Mayer, "most versions" of the story end on a tragic note, but all seem to indicate the great weaving skills of Urikohime. Scholar Kunio Yanagita listed the tale Nishiki Chōja as one version of the story that contains a happy ending.

Analysis
Japanese scholarship argues for some relationship between this tale and Aarne-Thompson-Uther Index tale type ATU 408, "The Three Citrons", since both tales involve a maiden born of a fruit and her replacement for a false bride (in the tale type) and for evil creature Amanojaku (in Japanese versions). In fact, professor Hiroko Ikeda classified the story of Urikohime as type 408B in his Japanese catalogue.

Attention has also been drawn to the motif of "The False Bride" that exists in both tales: in Urikohime, the youkai or ogress wears the skin of the slain girl. Folklorist Christine Goldberg recognizes that this is the motif Disguised Flayer (motif K1941 in the Motif-Index of Folk-Literature). This disguise is also used by heroines in other folktales.

Professor Fanny Hagin Mayer remarked on the characters of the elderly couple that adopts Urikohime, which appear in several other Japanese folktales as a set. The elderly woman teaches her adopted daughter skills in weaving.

See also
 Momotaro
 The Tale of the Bamboo Cutter

References

Bibliography

Further reading 
 剣持 弘子 [Kendo, Hiroko].「瓜子姫」 —話型分析及び「三つのオレンジ」との関係— ("Urikohime": Analysis and Relation with "Three Oranges"). In: 『口承文芸研究』nr. 11 (March, 1988). pp. 45-57.

External links 
Link to a variant of Urikohime and similar tales

Japanese fairy tales
Japanese folklore
ATU 400-459

es:Urikohime to Amanojaku
ja:うりこひめとあまのじゃく
zh:瓜子姬與天邪鬼